The Leda Clay Formation is a geologic formation in New Brunswick. It preserves fossils.

See also

 List of fossiliferous stratigraphic units in New Brunswick

References
 

Geology of New Brunswick